New Moon is the fourth studio album by Finnish band Swallow the Sun. The album was released on November 4, 2009 in Finland, November 9, 2009 in Europe, and November 10, 2009 in the United States. Recording of the album commenced on June 15 at Fascination Street Studios with Jens Bogren as executive producer. Wintersun drummer Kai Hahto replaced Pasi Pasanen and contributed drums on the album. Some versions of the album contain an alternate recording of "Servant of Sorrow", which features a guitar solo by Steve Rothery.

The Horror Songs continued from this Album which would be Horror Pt. III, and also previously being on The Morning Never Came - Horror I, Hope - Horror Pt. 2, then finally later on Emerald Forest and the Blackbird - Horror Pt IV.

On February 1, 2012, Svart Records released the album on LP, limited to 500 copies.

Track listing

Personnel

Swallow The Sun
Mikko Kotamäki - vocals 
Markus Jämsen - guitar 
Juha Raivio - guitar 
Aleksi Munter - keyboards 
Matti Honkonen - bass 
Kai Hahto - drums

Additional Personnel
Aleah Stanbridge - guest vocals on "Lights on the Lake"
Dan Swano - backing vocals on "Falling World"
Steve Rothery - guitar solo/lead guitar/guitars on "Servant of Sorrow"

Lyrical themes 

Generally, the songs mainly focus on themes of depression, death, mourning, and loss, with each song telling a story. These themes are often told with themes of horror, the paranormal and supernatural, such as the first track "These Woods Breathe Evil" describing a man's confession to a murder that he claims was motivated by the constant demands of the ghosts of a haunted forest that persist to possess him. This song is heavily influenced by the 90's television series "Twin Peaks" and the phrase "The owls are not what they seem" in the lyrics support this connection. Another example is "Lights on the Lake (Horror. pt III)" told from two points of view, one of the ghosts of a young woman who haunts a lake demanding to know why she was murdered by her father. The other point of view is of the father who describes his intentions for the murder were to save his daughter's soul from possession.

Charts

References 

Swallow the Sun albums
2009 albums
Albums produced by Jens Bogren